Sheykh Ali Tuseh (also Romanized as Sheykh ‘Alī Ţūseh, and Sheykh ‘Alī Tūseh, and Sheikh Ali Tooseh; also known as Shaghāltūsh, Shākaltūsh, and Shekhaltuse) is a village in Blukat Rural District, Rahmatabad and Blukat District, Rudbar County, Gilan Province, Iran. At the 2006 census, its population was 444, in 115 families.

References 

Populated places in Rudbar County